The Pinzgauer is a family of high-mobility all-terrain 4WD (4×4) and 6WD (6×6) military utility vehicles. The vehicle was originally developed in the late 1960s and manufactured by Steyr-Daimler-Puch of Graz, Austria, and was named after the Pinzgauer, an Austrian breed of cattle. They were most recently manufactured at Guildford in Surrey, England by BAE Systems Land & Armaments. It was popular amongst military buyers, and continued in production there throughout the rest of the century.

In 2000 the rights were sold to Automotive Technik Ltd (ATL) in the UK. ATL was acquired by Stewart & Stevenson Services, Inc. in 2005. In May 2006, Stewart & Stevenson became a subsidiary of the aerospace and defence group Armor Holdings, Inc. In 2007 Armor Holdings was acquired by BAE Systems plc, who discontinued UK production of the Pinzgauer, which was proving to be vulnerable to mines and improvised explosive devices in Afghanistan. Production ceased around 2009. Development work (done in the UK) on a planned Pinzgauer II was evaluated by a BAE subsidiary in Benoni, Gauteng, South Africa but no vehicle was ever made.

First generation

The original prototype was developed around 1969 and production began in 1971, as successor of the Steyr-Daimler-Puch Haflinger 700 AP 4×4 light military multi purpose offroad vehicle. The Pinzgauer first generation model (710, 712) was produced until 2000 by Steyr-Daimler-Puch in the city of Graz, Austria.

It was, and is in use in many armies around the world like Austria, Switzerland, United Kingdom, Saudi Arabia, Thailand, Albania, and Bolivia. When Austro-Canadian millionaire Frank Stronach took over the shareholder majority of Steyr-Daimler-Puch offroad vehicles, the rights to build Steyr's Pinzgauers were moved to Automotive Technik Ltd; and subsequently to a branch of BAE Systems. As of 2009, production of Pinzgauers seems to have stalled. The Graz plant has been building the Mercedes-Benz G Wagon / Puch G SUVs / offroad cars.

The Pinzgauer is one of the most capable all-terrain vehicles ever made. While not as fast on-road as an American Humvee, it can carry more troops, and move faster over rough trails. Even the smaller 710M can carry 10 people or two NATO pallets. The first generation Pinzgauer is available in both four-wheel drive (4×4) (model 710) and six-wheel drive (6×6) (model 712) versions.

The Pinzgauer was designed to be reliable and easy to fix; it is shipped with an air-cooled petrol engine with dual-Zenith 36 mm NDIX carburetors. The engine in the Pinzgauer was specifically designed for the vehicle; it has more than one oil pump so that the engine will not get starved of oil no matter how the vehicle is oriented.

The Pinzgauer has a chassis design which contributes to its high mobility. It has a central tube chassis with a transaxle which distributes the weight more evenly, and keeps the centre of gravity as low as possible. The differentials are all sealed units and require minimal additional lubrication. The Pinzgauer also has portal axles like the Unimog to provide extra clearance over obstacles. The 710 4×4 was the more popular variant, but the Pinzgauer was designed to have a very capable 6×6 configuration from the start. The rear suspension on the back of the 6×6 712 is designed to provide maximum traction in the most demanding circumstances along with increasing its towing, load carrying, and off-road abilities.

During production from 1971 until 1985, 18,349 first-generation 710s and 712s were produced and sold to both civilian and military customers.

Variants

710 model, 4×4

712 model, 6×6

The most common body types are either "K" (hard-topped) or "M" (soft-topped) types.

Specifications
All the first generation Pinzgauers are equipped with:
 2.5 litre inline four-cylinder air-cooled engine.  An exception was made on certain 712 variants towards the end of production that came with a 2.7-litre air-cooled four-cylinder engine.  This was primarily on ambulances.
 DIN rated motive power:  (105 hp SAE)
 Torque: 
 Five-speed manual transmission with two-speed transfer case
 four-wheel-drive or six-wheel-drive with on-the-fly hydraulic differential locks
 Fully independent suspension
 Backbone chassis tube
 Integrated differentials
 24 volt electrical system
 Vacuum assisted drum brakes
 Portal axles to give extra clearance

Second generation

In 1980, Steyr-Daimler-Puch started development on a second generation Pinzgauer.  After six years of research and development, the initial second generation Pinzgauer II rolled off the assembly line in 1986.  In 2000, Magna, who bought Steyr-Daimler-Puch, sold its rights to the Pinzgauer to Automotive Technik in the UK who took over production of the Pinzgauer. The Pinzgauer is now owned and produced by BAE Systems Land Systems in Guildford, Surrey, however production has ceased.

The four-wheel drive (4×4) model is now called a 716, and the six-wheel drive (6×6) model is now called a 718. The same letter body type designations apply.  The new 716 has the same payload rating as the old 712, and the new 718 also has a similarly higher payload capacity.

There were a few minor changes to the design of the Pinzgauer II:
 Inline six-cylinder Volkswagen Group Turbocharged diesel engine model D24T
 ZF Friedrichshafen four-speed automatic transmission, or five-speed manual transmission
 Slightly wider track
 Slightly bigger tyres
 Disc brakes
 Standard automatic transmission, with optional manual transmission

The second generation motor vehicle went through several minor revisions through its life, unlike the first generation which used the same design throughout production.  The first second-generation Pinzgauers were designated P80 (1980).  It went through a minor revision in 1990 (P90), and 1993 (P93), when an intercooler version of the VW engine (D24TIC) was substituted. A more significant engine change was carried out in 2002 when a new Volkswagen Group Turbocharged Direct Injection (TDI) engine was introduced to meet the new Euro3 emissions requirements.

Worldwide markets

The Pinzgauer is increasingly replacing the Land Rover Defender in the military utility vehicle role, despite its high cost of upwards of US$100,000 per unit. Pinzgauer (or Pinz as it is known to most British soldiers) is more common as a utility vehicle in Royal Artillery units due to its employment as a light gun tractor.  A new armoured version called the "Vector" entered service in the British Army in early 2007, as part of an effort to provide safer patrol vehicles for troops in Afghanistan.

The 6×6 Vector PPV (Protected Patrol Vehicle) would, according to the manufacturer, "Build on the existing proven design, with enhancements that will include a combination of physical protection, as well as the use of sophisticated electronic counter measures to maximise survivability while on patrol". However, the Vector PPV was found to have unreliable suspension and wheel hubs as well as poor protection against improvised explosive devices. It quickly lost the confidence of field commanders and was withdrawn from service.

The Pinzgauer is the basis for the Tactical Ground Station (TGS) element of the Raytheon Systems Limited Airborne Standoff Radar (ASTOR).  The TGS comprises two workstation vehicles, a mission support vehicle, and a standard utility vehicle.

Many Pinzgauers were sold to military forces (initially Austrian and Swiss) to be used as non-tactical utility vehicles. Typical military roles are as general-purpose utility truck, command vehicles, troop carrier, ambulance, and tow vehicle. Roles very similar to other civilian sourced vehicles like Land Rover in the UK, the Blazer CUCV in the US, and the Mercedes G in many European countries.

Yugoslavia bought 3975 Pinzgauers from 1971 in all variants 4x4 and 6x6.

The New Zealand Army has purchased 321 Pinzgauer vehicles in 8 variants to fulfill the Light Operational Vehicle (LOV) role.

The Malaysian Army purchased 168 2 Ton 4×4 716 Gun Tractors and 164 2 Ton 6×6 718 Mortar Transporters to replace older Volvo C303 and C304 in their inventories. It is affectionately called "Piglet" due to its design.

The US Army purchased 20 Turbo Diesel 718M during the early 1990s, imported for the Army’s Delta Force as a deep reconnaissance platform. They were used in the 1991 Gulf War as well as the 2003 Iraq war, and eventually phased out at 2010-2011.

The Pinzgauer was marketed to the civilian marketplace worldwide for use as campers, farm trucks, ambulances, fire-trucks, and rescue vehicles. Likewise, many ended up being used as tourist vans due to their large passenger capacity and stable, reliable platform.

Pinzgauers have been used as tourist transports in Africa, Australia, South America, Hawaii, and other exotic locales. Some are still in use today. Pinzgauers were marketed to- and used extensively by energy companies for oil exploration purposes. A few Pinzgauers were used for off-road racing, including the famous Paris to Dakar Rally and the International Rainforest Challenge in Malaysia.

Military users

Military users include:
 
 
 
 
 
 
 
 
 
 
 
 
 
 
 
 
   – Pinzgauer Vector: at least 3 armored ambulances and at least 8 APCs as of June 2022

Pinzgauer capabilities

The Pinzgauer is a highly accomplished off-road vehicle. Its capabilities, in some operational scenarios, are better than that of the Humvee and the Land Rover Defender.
 38°/45° approach and departure angles
 100% slope, or until tyres lose traction
  fording depth
  of ground clearance (lowest point when fully loaded)
 Can climb down a  wall
 43.5° side-slope
 1000/1500 kg of payload (4×4/6×6)
 top speed 
 (710 - 4×4): 
 (712 - 6×6):  
 (716 - 4×4):  
 (718 - 6×6): 
 Full engine power available for 710/712 at 
 M body type carries 10 people (4×4), 14 people (6×6)

See also
 Steyr-Puch Haflinger
 Humvee (HMMWV)
 Jeep
 Land Rover Wolf
 Land Rover 101 Forward Control
 Mercedes-Benz G-Class
 Toyota Mega Cruiser
 Toyota Type 73 Medium Truck
 UAZ-469
 Unimog
 Volvo C303

References

External links

 Official website
 The official website of the Pinzgauer's French-speaking users (Multilingual)
 BAE Systems official site
 Steyr-Daimler-Puch Pinzgauer technical information site
 Pinzgauer BBS
 C. Kieslings Pinzgauer Site
 Pinzgauer in the New Zealand Army

Military trucks
Cab over off-road vehicles
Road vehicles manufactured in the United Kingdom
Military vehicles of Austria
Steyr-Puch vehicles
Military vehicles introduced in the 1970s